= Daughters of the Flower Fragrant Garden =

Story of two sisters separated during China's civil war

- Cover for the first edition of Daughters of the Flower Fragrant Garden
- Author: Zhuqing Li
- Publication date: 2022

Daughters of the Flower Fragrant Garden: Two Sisters Separated by China's Civil War is a 2022 book by Zhuqing Li (Chinese: 李竹青), published by W. W. Norton & Company. The author tells the story of her two aunts, who were separated on opposite sides after the conclusion of the Chinese Civil War in 1949.

== Contents ==
One aunt, Chen Wenjun (traditional Chinese: 陳文鈞; simplified Chinese: 陈文钧), was stranded in Kinmen (Jinmen). Another aunt, known under an assumed name used by the author, Hong, remained in Mainland China. Deidre Mask of The New York Times wrote that "it is Hong who suffers the most". Both aunts lived in the Flower Fragrant Garden complex in Fuzhou before the conclusion of the civil war.

== Background ==
Zhuqing Li is an East Asian Studies professor. Her place of employment is Brown University.

== Reception ==
Mask wrote that Daughters of the Flower Fragrant Garden is "absorbing" and that the "struggle" of Hong "drives" the work.

Kirkus Reviews described it as "a poignant story of sisterly love and the search for self-knowledge in the face of considerable challenges".
